Mohamed Jaman Al-Dosari (born 1 July 1946) is a Saudi Arabian sprinter. He competed in the men's 400 metres at the 1972 Summer Olympics.

References

1946 births
Living people
Athletes (track and field) at the 1972 Summer Olympics
Saudi Arabian male sprinters
Olympic athletes of Saudi Arabia
Place of birth missing (living people)